"Ms. Jackson" is a song by American hip hop duo Outkast, consisting of André 3000 and Big Boi. It was released on October 24, 2000, as the second single from Outkast's fourth album, Stankonia. It topped the US Billboard Hot 100 chart for one week on February 17, 2001, and also reached number one in Germany, the Netherlands, Norway, and Sweden. Rolling Stone ranked it at number 55 on their "100 Best Songs of the 2000s" list in June 2011 and at number 145 on their "Top 500 Greatest Songs of All Time" list in 2021. In October 2011, NME placed it at number 81 on its list of the "150 Best Tracks of the Past 15 Years".

"Ms. Jackson" won the Grammy Award for Best Rap Performance by a Duo or Group at the 44th Annual Grammy Awards. The music video, directed by F. Gary Gray, features animals nodding along to the song, won the BET Award for Video of the Year and MTV Video Music Award for Best Hip-Hop Video. The single helped sell the album following the commercial underperformance of the lead single, "B.O.B", which, despite near universal acclaim from critics, failed to chart on the Hot 100 and only reached number 69 on the Billboard Hot R&B/Hip-Hop Songs chart.

Background and writing
In Vibe magazine, a few years after the song was released, André Benjamin (André 3000) recalled creating the song, "'Ms. Jackson' was an acoustic guitar song that I was doing at home. Then I just converted it over into something people could understand a little bit more." The song was inspired, in part, by Benjamin's relationship with Erykah Badu and her mother. In November 2016, Badu described her initial reaction to the song, stating that, "It hit kind of a sore spot. I didn't wanna hear that, especially when I heard Big Boi's verse. When I heard André's verse, I felt very good because his verse was really, really inspiring. He just said how he felt and it was his honest feelings and I always respected that and listened to what he felt and appreciated it." Badu also noted that her mother loved the song, saying, "Baby, she bought herself a 'Ms. Jackson' license plate. She had the mug, she had the ink pen, she had the headband, everything."

Content
Lyrically, the song is a love profession to the mother of the narrator's romantic partner that examines the issues that arise from having a child out of wedlock. In the song, the narrator promises to support his child regardless of what happens. The instrumentation samples the Brothers Johnson's version (with various audio effects, prominently reversing) of "Strawberry Letter 23", by Shuggie Otis.

Critical reception
Billboard magazine wrote that song's message is genuine, noting its 1980s hip-hop sound and Outkast's "frantic" lyrics that emphasize the track's storyline. Reviewing the parent album, the same publication compared the track to an "old-school hip-hop love song" and called it "oh-so-radio-ready". Marci Kenon of Billboard called the "babies' mommas' mommas" hook memorable and later referred to the track as "infectious".

"Ms. Jackson" is widely considered one of Outkast's best songs. In 2020, The Ringer ranked the song number five on their list of the 50 greatest Outkast songs, and in 2021, The Guardian ranked the song number six on their list of the 20 greatest Outkast songs.

Music video
The song's music video, directed by F. Gary Gray and produced by Earthtone III, works as a possible metaphor for the duo's "stormy" relationships with the mothers of their children and their families. In the United States, a DVD single featuring the videos for "B.O.B" and "Ms. Jackson" was released in 2000, before the other physical formats. Along with Toni Braxton's "Just Be a Man About It", this single was the first to bear only a DVD credit on the Billboard Hot 100 until the other formats were issued. Because "Ms. Jackson" was the only Outkast song that was present on the Hot 100 at the time, sales points were added to this song instead of "B.O.B".

Track listings

US maxi-CD and 12-inch single, Australian CD single
 "Ms. Jackson" (radio mix) – 4:03
 "Ms. Jackson" (instrumental) – 4:34
 "Sole Sunday" feat. Goodie Mob (radio mix) – 4:41
 "Sole Sunday" feat. Goodie Mob (instrumental) – 4:41

US DVD single
 "B.O.B" (video)
 "Ms. Jackson" (video)
 "What Is Stankonia? An Exclusive Interview with Big Boi & Dre"

European CD single
 "Ms. Jackson" (radio mix) – 4:03
 "Ms. Jackson" (instrumental) – 4:34

UK CD single
 "Ms. Jackson" (radio edit) – 3:36
 "Elevators (Me & You)" – 4:56
 "Ms. Jackson" (video) – 4:58

UK 12-inch and cassette single
 "Ms. Jackson" (album version) – 4:30
 "Elevators (Me & You)" – 4:56

Credits and personnel
Credits are lifted from the UK CD single liner notes.

Studio
 Recorded and mixed at Stankonia Recording (Atlanta, Georgia)

Personnel

 André 3000 – writing (as André Benjamin), vocals, background vocals, guitar
 Big Boi – writing (as Antwan Patton), vocals
 David Sheats – writing
 Earthtone III – keyboards, programming, production, arrangement
 Rajinder Kala – backwards congas
 Marvin "Chanz" Parkman – piano
 Aaron Mills of Cameo – bass
 John Frye – recording
 Malik Albert – recording assistant
 Vincent Alexander – recording assistant
 Warren Bletcher – recording assistant, mixing assistant
 Neal H. Pogue – mixing

Charts

Weekly charts

Year-end charts

Certifications

Release history

References

2000 singles
2000 songs
2001 singles
Arista Records singles
Billboard Hot 100 number-one singles
Dutch Top 40 number-one singles
European Hot 100 Singles number-one singles
Music videos directed by F. Gary Gray
Number-one singles in Germany
Number-one singles in Norway
Number-one singles in Sweden
Outkast songs
Songs about mothers
Songs written by André 3000
Songs written by Big Boi
Songs written by Mr. DJ
American pop songs